George Munger may refer to:
George Munger (American football) (1909–1994), American football player and coach at the University of Pennsylvania
George Munger (artist) (1781–1825), engraver known for portraits and miniatures
George Munger (soldier),  soldier in the American Civil War
George David Munger, better known as Red Munger (1918–1996), Major League Baseball pitcher, 1943–1956